Davacaridae is a family of mites in the order Mesostigmata.

Species
Davacaridae contains one genus, with one recognized species:

 Genus Davacarus Hunter, in Gressitt 1970
 Davacarus gressitti Hunter, in Gressitt 1970

References

Mesostigmata
Acari families